Lyndelle Higginson (born 5 November 1978 in Albury, New South Wales) is an Australian track cyclist.

Higginson competed in the women's track sprint at the 1998 Commonwealth Games in Kuala Lumpur, finishing in fourth place. She also competed in the women's track points race but failed to finish.

Higginson competed in Women's track time trial at the 2000 Summer Olympics and finished in 14th of 17.

References 

1978 births
Living people
Cyclists at the 2000 Summer Olympics
Olympic cyclists of Australia
Australian female cyclists
Cyclists at the 1998 Commonwealth Games
Commonwealth Games competitors for Australia
Sportspeople from Albury
Cyclists from New South Wales
20th-century Australian women
21st-century Australian women